Volunteers in Medicine (VIM) is national nonprofit dedicated to building a network of free primary health care clinics for the uninsured and medically underserved.

Mission
The organization's stated mission is "To promote and guide the development of a national network of free clinics emphasizing the use of retired medical and community volunteers within a culture of caring to improve access to health care for America’s underserved, particularly the uninsured."

History 
For two decades, the Volunteers in Medicine national office assisted local communities and built a national network of free health care clinics to care for the uninsured and medically underserved. This network is known as the VIM Alliance. Volunteers in Medicine has withstood many changes in the health care landscape. Recognizing that free clinics continue to hold a distinctive place in the health care safety net, in 2018 the national office made a strategic decision to expand the VIM Alliance to include established free clinics that are aligned with the VIM Model. Established clinics that join the VIM Alliance are referred to as expansion sites.

Expert VIM national office staff provide individualized assistance to developing free clinics and established sites that wish to join the VIM Alliance. For both groups, the emphasis is on upholding the VIM Model. Developing sites receive guidance through each phase of the clinic development process, from the initial feasibility study through the opening of the clinic. Expansion sites that are aligned with the VIM Model receive assistance and educational resources to assist them in attaining VIM Alliance membership status.

VIM Alliance
The VIM Alliance is a national network of free clinics that provide health care services to the uninsured and medically underserved. This peer-to-peer network links clinic leaders and provides access to information related to all aspects of clinic operations.

Further reading
Volunteers in Medicine: A Culture of Caring by Kristine Wyer
Authentic Patriotism by Stephen Kiernan
Circle of Caring: The Story of the Volunteers in Medicine Clinic by Jack B. McConnell, M.D.

References

External links
 Volunteers In Medicine Website
 VIM Clinic Directory

Non-profit organizations based in Vermont
Organizations based in Burlington, Vermont
Medical volunteerism